The Courageous Dr. Christian is a 1940 American film directed by Bernard Vorhaus. It was part of a film series about Dr. Christian.

Plot summary

Kindhearted Dr. Paul Christian is appalled by the harsh living conditions of homeless inhabitants of Squatterstown. He lets one of the homeless—Dave Williams—live with him, and goes on to ask the city to build housing for the poor. He realizes that it is the powerful Mrs. Norma Stewart who has the last say in the matter since it is her property they would build on.

Mrs. Stewart has long been in love with Dr. Christian, and sends her two wards Jack and Ruth Williams to him, with the deed and a letter stating the condition under which she would donate the property to the city, which is that the good doctor agree to marry her.  However, the message is not delivered, since the children lose the letter, and the doctor receives only the deed.

Too late does the doctor realize the price he must pay for the property, and the city also backs out of their agreement to build housing for the poor and homeless. The result is that the homeless have nowhere to go, and have to move into another vacant lot with no proper housing.

Before the police can remove the unwanted new tenants, an epidemic of spinal meningitis spreads in the area, and Dr. Christian puts the whole area under quarantine. The city inhabitants become aware of the horrible conditions of the homeless and soon voices are raised to build public housing.

The story ends with Dr. Christian being released from his contract with Mrs. Stewart, as she gets more involved with raising her wards. Homeless Dave is overjoyed with all the sympathy shown by the city's inhabitants and starts to believe in a brighter future after all.

Cast 
Jean Hersholt as Dr. Paul Christian
Dorothy Lovett as Judy Price
Robert Baldwin as Roy Davis
Tom Neal as Dave Williams
Maude Eburne as Mrs. Hastings
Vera Lewis as Mrs. Norma Stewart
George Meader as Harry Johnson
Bobby Larson as Jack Williams
Bobette Bentley as Ruth Williams
Reginald Barlow as Sam
Jacqueline De River as Martha
Edmund Glover as Tommy Wood
Mary Davenport as Jane Wood
Earle Ross as Grandpa
Sylvia Andrew as Mrs. Sam
Catherine Courtney as Mrs. Morris
Al Bridge as Sheriff
James C. Morton as Bailey
Fred Holmes as Wilson
Frank LaRue as Stanley
Budd Buster as Jones
Broderick O'Farrell as Harris

External links

References

1940 films
1940s English-language films
American black-and-white films
1940 drama films
Medical-themed films
RKO Pictures films
American drama films
Films with screenplays by Ring Lardner Jr.
Films scored by William Lava
Films directed by Bernard Vorhaus
1940s American films
Dr. Christian films